Nikolaos Mavrommatis (born 19 July 1980) is a Greek sport shooter. At the 2012 Summer Olympics he competed in the Men's skeet, finishing in 9th place.

He earned a quota place for the 2020 Summer Olympics with a bronze-medal performance at the 2019 European Shotgun Championship.

References

External links
 
 

Living people
1980 births
Greek male sport shooters
Olympic shooters of Greece
Shooters at the 2012 Summer Olympics
Shooters at the 2015 European Games
European Games competitors for Greece
Shooters at the 2019 European Games
Shooters at the 2020 Summer Olympics
Sportspeople from Athens
21st-century Greek people